The Minnesota Duluth Bulldogs represent the University of Minnesota Duluth in WCHA women's ice hockey during the 2017-18 NCAA Division I women's ice hockey season.

Offseason
May 5:  Junior Goaltender Maddie Rooney has been chosen to the 2017-18 US National Team, in preparation for the 2018 Winter Olympics in Korea.  Rooney will miss the 2017-18 Minnesota-Duluth season to fulfill her Olympic commitment.  She is the youngest player chosen for Team USA.

Recruiting

2017–18 Bulldogs

Standings

2017-18 Bulldogs Schedule

|-
!colspan=12 style="background:#AF1E2D;color:#FFC61E;"| Regular Season

|-
!colspan=12 style="background:#AF1E2D;color:#FFC61E;"| WCHA Tournament

Awards and honors

References

Minnesota-Duluth
Minnesota Duluth Bulldogs women's ice hockey seasons